The 2018 Supercheap Auto Bathurst 1000 was a motor racing event for Supercars, held on the weekend of 4–7 October 2018. It was staged at the Mount Panorama Circuit in Bathurst, New South Wales, Australia and featured of a 1000 kilometre race. The event was the thirteenth of sixteen in the 2018 Supercars Championship and incorporated Race 25 of the series. It was also the second event of the 2018 Enduro Cup.

The race was won by Craig Lowndes and Steven Richards driving a Holden Commodore ZB for Triple Eight Race Engineering.

Report

Background 
The event was the 61st running of the Bathurst 1000, which was first held at the Phillip Island Grand Prix Circuit in 1960 as a 500-mile race for Australian-made standard production sedans, and marked the 58th time that the race was held at Mount Panorama. It was the 22nd running of the Australian 1000 race, which was first held after the organisational split between the Australian Racing Drivers Club and V8 Supercars Australia that saw two "Bathurst 1000" races contested in both 1997 and 1998. It was the 20th time the race had been held as part of the Supercars Championship and the sixth time it formed part of the Enduro Cup. The defending winners of the race were David Reynolds and Luke Youlden.

Shane van Gisbergen entered the event as the championship leader, 55 points clear of DJR Team Penske's Scott McLaughlin. Van Gisbergen's Triple Eight Race Engineering team-mate Jamie Whincup was third in the points standings, 338 points from the lead. In the Teams' Championship, Triple Eight held a 656-point lead over DJR Team Penske. In the Enduro Cup standings, Triple Eight team-mates Jamie Whincup and Paul Dumbrell led the pairing of Van Gisbergen and Earl Bamber by 24 points.

Entry list
Twenty-six cars were entered in the event. As in 2017, there were no additional "Wildcard" entries entered in the race. Four drivers would make their first start in the Bathurst 1000 - two-time Le Mans 24 Hours winner Earl Bamber, Super2 drivers Will Brown and Bryce Fullwood, and 'main-gamer' Anton de Pasquale. Teams Matt Stone Racing and 23Red Racing would also make their debuts in 'the Great Race', however the former contained many crew members from the former Stone Brothers Racing outfit and the latter was a continuation of Lucas Dumbrell Motorsport under new owners. It was the last start in the Bathurst 1000 for Paul Dumbrell and Jason Bright.

Results

Practice

Qualifying

Top 10 Shootout

Race

Championship standings after Race 25 

Drivers' Championship standings

Teams Championship

Enduro Cup

 Note: Only the top five positions are included for three sets of standings.

References

Supercheap Auto Bathurst 1000
Motorsport in Bathurst, New South Wales